The Gratidiini are a tribe of stick insects based on the type genus Clonaria (as an old synonym Gratidia Stål, 1875) and first used by Cliquennois in 2005.  Genera are known to be distributed in: Africa, Europe, temperate and tropical Asia and various  Pacific Islands.

This tribe was previously placed in the Pachymorphinae, but the current consensus (2022) is that it is better placed in the Bacilloidea: either in the family Bacillidae or a proposed new family "Gratidiidae".

Genera
The Phasmida Species File lists:
 Adelungella Brunner von Wattenwyl, 1907
 Adelungella Brunner von Wattenwyl, 1907
 Burria Brunner von Wattenwyl, 1900
 Clonaria Stål, 1875
 Gharianus Werner, 1908
 Gratidiinilobus Brock, 2005
 Ladakhomorpha Hennemann & Conle, 1999
 Leptynia Pantel, 1890
 Linocerus Gray, 1835
 Macellina Uvarov, 1940
 Maransis Karsch, 1898
 Paragongylopus Chen & He, 1997
 Phthoa Karsch, 1898
 Pijnackeria Scali, 2009
 Sceptrophasma Brock & Seow-Choen, 2000
 Zangphasma Chen & He, 2008
 Zehntneria Brunner von Wattenwyl, 1907

References

External Links

Phasmatodea tribes